New York Harp Ensemble (NYHE), classical music ensemble founded by Aristid von Würtzler and his wife, Barbara Pniewska harpists. It has been operating between 1969 and 1997.

Background

Aristid von Würtzler emigrated from Hungary into the United States in 1956. Initially, he played in orchestras (e.g. between 1958 and 1961 in the New York Philharmonic Orchestra), then he began his solo career. After a while he noticed that as a male performer he could not break into television in America. So he decided to establish his own harp ensemble that can display more spectacular and colorful shows. He took Mireille Flour's Belgian band as an example though tried to learn from their rapid fall which was due to the constant rivalry between the harpists.

He met his future wife in Geneva during a harp contest in 1969.  The young and reclusive artist in the bud represented Poland.  After the contest Würtzler offered the girl a scholarship in University of Hartford, where he was himself a professor. Barbara also came from a musical family, his father was a renowned violist in Warsaw. She started piano at six then switched to harp, and in 1964 graduated from the Academy of Music in Warsaw in the harp department.

History 

The group worked for 28 years. They gave thousands of concerts in more than 60 countries worldwide, and made several television, radio and LP/CD recordings. In addition to the couple the harp ensemble featured two additional members who changed with time. Over the decades they played with Sandra Bittermann, Pattee Cohen, Coleen Cooney, Elizabeth Etters, Rebecca Flannery, Monika Jarecki, Eva Jaslar, Sylvia Kowalczuk, Dagmar Platilova and Dorell Maiorescu. Some of them after leaving the band became renowned harpists and professors of the harp.

The International Association of Harpists and Friends of the Harp was founded by Pierre Jamet French professor and virtuoso in 1962 and the Israeli government organized the first International Harp Competition in the same year. Würtzler became an active member of the American harp community and served as a member of the Jury at the Harp Contests.
  
The group gained undying merits in promoting – from the late fifties – the virtually unknown harp, organizing harpist activity and expanding harp-literature. The latter aim was reached by making own compositions and transcriptions, as well as by calling upon famous composers (Leonard Bernstein, Karlheinz Stockhausen) to write pieces for harp. Special emphasis was placed on Polish and Hungarian authors' works (Franz Liszt, Béla Bartók, Zoltán Kodály, György Ligeti, Zsolt Durkó, Frigyes Hidas, Tibor Serly) and also those of the host countries. The NYHE's repertoire consisted of almost two hundred pieces from baroque style through romantic to modern melody (Marcel Tournier , Carlos Salzedo, Marcel Grandjany). Würtzler paid great attention to meet the needs of the audience, therefore always maintained three complete programs, from which the host could choose the most suitable one. What is more, besides playing classical music pieces, they were among the first to stage a spectacular crossover-style show. In one of their scherzo they played as campaigners in canvasser hats. In another they presented a tipsy bar scene with jazz music. In a third one Liszt Hungarian Rhapsody No. 2 was performed in the characteristic style of several nations, like making an imaginary journey, every minute alternating between the styles of music. (Würtzler was a man with a great sense of humor; he often called his group "my harem", even in public interviews.)

The group was invited to the White House by presidents Jimmy Carter, Ronald Reagan, George H. W. Bush and Bill Clinton and played there five times. They were also invited to perform for Pope John Paul II at the Vatican City in 1985.  They visited the Bogotá presidential palace in 1977 and went to Honduras and the Philippines in 1979.

From the second half of the eighties they regularly returned to Hungary. The band toured in Szombathely, Sopron and Kőszeg in 1988, and later gave a very successful concert at the Budapest Congress Center. In 1985 Hungaroton released their Baroque recording which was made earlier in New York, and then they made further recordings, sometimes with other harpists, e.g. Éva Marton.

Many times they played in extreme conditions, such as in South America, where due to the high humidity the harps sounded very strange. In addition, the ensemble gained considerable experience both in travelling and transporting harps. They toured in many countries and travelled according to the local ways (U-Haul trailer, bus, railway, boat, airplane etc.). They shared their experiences with other harpists and harp makers willingly.

Würtzler was the band's director and driving force undoubtedly. He tried to create – with precision – the best circumstances to ensure the success of the band (program, costume, advertising and media). However, he admitted that Barbara took a big part from the beginning in organizing, and some of the transcripts were her work. Therefore, she played an equal role with her husband in the life of the band, although from behind the scenes.

The group disbanded in 1997 after Würtzler's death.

Compositions for New York Harp Ensemble

 Bernstein, Leonard (USA): Chorale and Meditation
 Chiti, Gianopaulo (Italy): Breakers
 Creston, Paul (USA): Olympia Rhapsody for Harp
 Damase, Jean-Michel (France): Concertino
 Dello Joio, Norman (USA): Bagatella
 Durkó Zsolt (Hungary): Serenata Per Quatro Arpas
 Flagello, Nicolas (USA): Arismo II. for 4 Harps, Island of Mysterious Bells
 Hanus, Jan (Czechoslovakia): Introduzione E Toccata
 Hidas Frigyes (Hungary): Hungarian Melodies
 Hovhaness, Alan (USA) – Stuart Colidge: Spirituals in Sunshine and Shadow
 Kasilag, Lucrecia R. (Philippines): Diversions II for 4 Harps
 Ligeti György (Hungary/Germany): Continuum
 Maayani, Ami (Israel): Arabesque for 4 Harps
 Mchedelov, Mikhail (Soviet Union): Song Procession for 4 Harps and Drum
 Montori, Sergio (Italy): Iron Garden”
 Saygun, Ahmed Adnan (Turkey): Three Preludes for Four Harps, Three Melodies for Four Harps
 Serly Tibor (Hungary/USA): Canonic Prelude for 4 Harps
 Takemitsu, Toru (Japan): Wavelength
 Wha, Lin (China): Amid Flowers Beside the River
 Wiłkomirski, Josef (Poland): Concerto for Four Harps

Records

 New York Harps Ensemble/CRS 4130 Golden Crest Quadrophonic
 New York Harp Ensemble/CRS 4121 Golden Crest Quadrophonic
 18th Century Concerti and Strings, Musical Heritage Society 3320
 18th Century Concerti Stereo Cassette MHC 5320
 XVIII Century Music for Harp Ensemble MHS 3239
 XVIII Century Stereo Cassette MHC 5239
 Contemporary Music for Harp Ensemble MHS 1184
 Contemporary Stereo Cassette MHC 2100
 Contemporary Music for Harp and Strings MHS 3370 (Solo: von Würtzler)
 American Cavalcade MHS 3307
 Romantic Music for Harp Ens. and Solo Harp MHS 3611 (Solo: von Würtzler)
 Romantic Music Stereo Cassette MHC 5611
 Musical Memories, Vol. I. MHS 3670
 Musical Memories, Vol. I. Stereo Cassette MHC 5670
 Christmas with New York Harp Ensemble MHS 3483 (Solo: von Würtzler)
 Christmas with New York Harp Ensemble Stereo Cassette MHC 5483
 An Evening with the New York Harp Ensemble MHS 3890 (Solo: von Würtzler)
 Musical Memories Vol. II. MHS 4259 (Solo: von Würtzler)
 Musical Memories, Vol. II. Stereo Cassette MHC 6259 (Solo: von Würtzler)
 Rhapsody for Harp and Orchestra, MHS 4387 (Solo: von Würtzler)
 Mostly Concertos, MHS 4260 (Solo: von Würtzler)
 The New York Harp Ensemble, Hungaroton SLPX 12726
 The New York Harp Ensemble, Hungaroton, MK 12726
 The New York Harp Ensemble, Hungaroton Stereo HCD 12726
 A Pastorale Christmas, MusicMasters, MMD 20098A
 A Pastorale Christmas, MusicMasters Stereo Cassette, MMC 40098Z
 A Pastorale Christmas, MusicMasters Compact Disc. CD MMD 60098Y
 A Pastorale Christmas with NYH Ensemble MHS 4610 Digital-Stereo
 A Pastorale Christmas with NYH Ensemble Digital-Stereo Cassette 6611
 Weinachtiiche Harfenmusik NYHE and Pro Arte Chamber Orchestra, conductor: Aristid von Würtzler, Orfeo, Stereo-Digital-S 122 841 B
 Éva Marton with the New York Ensemble, Hungaroton SLPD 12939
 Éva Marton with the New York Harp Ensemble, Hungaroton MK 12939
 Éva Marton with the New York Harp Ensemble, Hungaroton HDC 12939
 Hungaroton Highlights, 1987–88, Hungaroton, HCD 1661

Bibliography

 Előd Juhász – István Kaposi Kis: Beszélő hárfa. Aristid von Würtzler. Idegenforgalmi Propaganda és Kiadó Vállalat, Budapest, 1990.

External links 
 Interview with Barbara von Wurtzler Polish-American Harpist First Hungarian Harp Blog
 Obituary of Aristid von Wurtzler First Hungarian Harp Blog 
 Carl Swanson: Traveling with The New York Harp Ensemble swansonharp.com
 Sto lat! Ewa Jaslar and a decade of the Polish Harp Society harpblog.info

Harp ensembles
American classical music groups
Musical groups from New York City
American harpists
Hungarian harpists
Musical groups established in 1969
Musical groups disestablished in 1997